IRIB Shoma (You, Shabake-ye Shomâ) was a national ethnicity culture TV channel in Iran which was launched on July 30, 2011 and was the second Iranian television channel to broadcast in digital mode. This channel was available in most provinces, which could be received using Set-top box devices and satellite televisions. This channel shut down on March 17, 2016 by merging in IRIB Amoozesh, but relaunched on September 20, 2016. Due to synergistic policies, this channel - alongside the channel IRIB Iran Kala - were discontinued on July 27, 2022, with their signals shutting down at a later date.

Logos

See also
 Islamic Republic of Iran Broadcasting

References

External links

IRIB Shoma Live streaming

Islamic Republic of Iran Broadcasting
Television stations in Iran
Persian-language television stations
Television channels and stations established in 2011